Peter Khalife (born 29 January 1990) is a football agent, manager, and former player. Born in Cyprus to Lebanese parents, Khalife was raised in Sweden and has both Lebanese and Swedish citizenship.

Khalife is the owner of Superior Squad Sports Management, one of the world's largest youth agencies, and Lebanon's largest football agency. He is also the founder of Superior Squad International, a youth pathway project. Khalife had a playing stint at Racing Beirut in 2014–15, while also managing the club's youth sector.

Early life
Born on 29 January 1990 in Limassol, Cyprus to Lebanese parents, Khalife was raised in Sweden. He holds both Lebanese and Swedish citizenship.

Player career
Khalife began playing football at age seven. He played for Lebanese Premier League club Racing Beirut during the 2014–15 season. On 7 October 2015, Khalife moved to Sagesse.

Managerial career
Khalife has a UEFA B Licence. While playing for Racing Beirut in 2014–15, Khalife coached their reserve side. In 2015, he founded a youth academy in Lebanon: Superior Squad International Academy.

Khalife is the International Coach of Superior Squad, Elite Soccer Academy's youth division. He led them in the 2019 Omonia Cup in Cyprus, winning the tournament undefeated.

Agency career
In 2015, Khalife founded a football agency called "Superior Squad Sports Management". Beginning in Lebanon, the agency first expanded to Cyprus. It is the largest football agency owned by a Lebanese – representing about 300 youth players worldwide, and operates in over 10 countries worldwide.

Since 2019, Khalife works as a scout and agent for Cypriot club AC Omonia. In 2020 Khalife signed deals with several Spanish La Liga clubs, to become their talent scout in the Middle East, the Gulf region, Cyprus and Australia.

Personal life
Khalife speaks five languages: Arabic, English, French, Greek, and Swedish. He has also lived for several years in Larnaca, Cyprus.

References

External links

 
 

1990 births
Living people
Lebanese footballers
Swedish people of Lebanese descent
Sportspeople of Lebanese descent
Association football wingers
Lebanese Premier League players
Racing Club Beirut players
Sagesse SC footballers
Lebanese sports agents
Swedish sports agents
Sportspeople from Limassol
Association football agents
Association football scouts